Florian Sotoca (born 25 October 1990) is a French professional footballer who plays as a striker for Ligue 1 club Lens.

Career
Florian Sotoca joined Grenoble in 2016. 

On 9 July 2019, Sotoca joined Ligue 2 club RC Lens on a permanent transfer. On 13 December 2021, he signed a contract extension, keeping him at the club until June 2024.  

On 7 August 2022, Sotoca scored a hat-trick for Lens in a 3–2 victory over Brest in Ligue 1.

On 24 January 2023, he signed a new contract extension with Lens until 2026.

Career statistics

References

External links

 

1990 births
Living people
Association football forwards
French footballers
Ligue 1 players
Ligue 2 players
Championnat National players
FC Martigues players
AS Béziers (2007) players
Montpellier HSC players
Grenoble Foot 38 players
RC Lens players
Universiade gold medalists for France
Universiade medalists in football
Medalists at the 2013 Summer Universiade
French people of Spanish descent